Margaret Court defeated the defending champion Billie Jean King in the final, 6–4, 6–1 to win the women's singles tennis title at the 1969 Australian Open. It was her eighth Australian Open title and her fourteenth major title overall.

This was the first edition of the tournament to take place in the Open Era, where amateur and professional players can enter the same tournaments.

Seeds

  Billie Jean King (final)
  Margaret Court (champion)
  Ann Jones (semifinals)
  Kerry Melville (semifinals)
  Rosie Casals (quarterfinals)
  Karen Krantzcke (quarterfinals)
  Lesley Hunt (quarterfinals)
  Judy Tegart-Dalton (first round)
  Lesley Turner Bowrey (second round)
  Françoise Dürr (second round)

Draw

Finals

Section 1

Section 2

External links
 1969 Australian Open – Women's draws and results at the International Tennis Federation

Women's Singles
Australian Open (tennis) by year – Women's singles
1969 in women's tennis
1969 in Australian women's sport